Jacques Raymond Brascassat (August 30, 1804 – February 28,1867) was a famous French painter noted for his landscapes, and in particular his animal paintings.

Biography
Brascassat was born in Bordeaux, Southwestern France, and studied art in Paris under Louis Hersent at the École des Beaux-Arts in Paris. He won second place in the Prix de Rome of 1825 with a picture of the Hunt of Meleager.

He went to Italy and painted a number of landscapes which were exhibited between 1827 and 1835, but subsequently he devoted himself mainly to animal painting, in which his reputation as an artist was made. His Bulls Fighting (1837) in the Nantes Museum of Arts, Nantes, France and a similar painting (1855) Museum of Fine Arts of Huston, Texas, USA and his Cow Attacked by Wolves (1845) in Museum of Fine Arts, Leipzig, Germany, are considered some of the best of his paintings.  

He was known for the accuracy of his observation, drawing and painting. He was elected a member of the Académie française in 1846. He died in Paris on the 28th of February 1867.

Gallery

See also
 Rudolf Koller
 Rosa Bonheur

References

19th-century French painters
French male painters
Burials at Père Lachaise Cemetery
Members of the Académie des beaux-arts
1804 births
1867 deaths
19th-century French male artists